Aframomum verrucosum is a species in the ginger family, Zingiberaceae. It was first described by John Michael Lock.

Range
Aframomum verrucosum is native from West Central Tropical Africa to Western Kenya.

References 

verrucosum